"Promises, Promises" is the first single to be taken from The Cooper Temple Clause's second album, Kick Up the Fire, and Let the Flames Break Loose. It reached number nineteen on the UK Singles Chart and has been featured on the 2004 video games, WRC 4 and FIFA Football 2004. The song's main riff is based on the guitar line of Sonic Youth's "Drunken Butterfly" from their 1992 album Dirty.

Track listings
CD
"Promises, Promises"
"On. Off. On."
"I Know"

DVD
"Promises, Promises"
"Resident Writer"
"Promises, Promises" (video)
"Making of video"

7" vinyl
"Promises, Promises"
"Our Eyes Are Bright"

Japanese EP
"Promises, Promises"
"On. Off. On."
"Resident Writer"
"Our Eyes Are Bright"
"Before the Moor"
"I Want You to Think I Could Be"

International CD
"Promises, Promises"
"On. Off. On."
"I Know"
"Resident Writer"

2003 singles
The Cooper Temple Clause songs
2003 songs